Duygu Doğan (born 28 May 2000) is a Turkish female rhythmic gymnast. She won one gold medal in the 3 Hoops + 4 Clubs event at the 2020 Rhythmic Gymnastics European Championships held in Ukraine.

Born in Yenimahalle district of Ankara, Turkey on 28 May 2000, she is a student of Ankara University. In the national team, she is trained by head coach Kamelia Dunavska from Bulgaria, and her assistant Ülker Şule Bağışlayan. Doğan serves as captain of the national rhythmic gymnastics team.

References

External links 
 

2000 births
Living people
People from Yenimahalle
Sportspeople from Ankara
Turkish sportswomen
Turkish rhythmic gymnasts
Ankara University alumni
Medalists at the Rhythmic Gymnastics European Championships